Brachylomia discolor is a moth of the family Noctuidae first described by Smith in 1904. It is found in the western United States from southern Idaho and southern Wyoming southward through Utah and Nevada to southern California and New Mexico.

External links
Bug Guide
Images

Brachylomia
Moths described in 1904